Les Parisiens (first part of the Le Genre humain trilogy) is a film directed by Claude Lelouch, released 15 September 2004.

Synopsis

A string of characters, often marginal, form part of what one might call the "love Richter Scale" and intersect, forming Prévert inventory. Among them, two singers, Shaa and Massimo fall in love, and share their story.

Starring 
 Maïwenn : Shaa
 Mathilde Seigner : Clémentine / Anne 
 Arielle Dombasle : Sabine Duchemin
 Xavier Deluc : Pierre
 Agnès Soral : Pierre's wife
 Michèle Bernier : Tania
 Ticky Holgado : God
 Lise Lamétrie : Lise
 Francis Perrin : Didier
 Grégori Derangère : The hustler
 Evelyne Buyle : The woman of the train
 Antoine Duléry : A restaurant owner
 André Falcon : The jewelry director
 Mireille Perrier : The woman on the docks
 Charles Gérard : Jewelry client
 Frédéric Bouraly

About
Claude Lelouch financed the production of this film himself, through his company, Les Films 13, to the tune of €10M. He acknowledged that it was a major risk, and may have led to his personal ruin. 
On its release date, the film only sold  tickets, representing a major disappointment. Upset by this, Claude Lelouch offered free tickets to people around Paris on 17 September 2004 up to 19:00. However, by the end of the week, les Parisiens still only had  viewers.
The film is dedicated to Ticky Holgado, who died in January 2004.

See also

 Le Courage d'aimer (recutting of Parisiens and scenes from the second part of the unfinished Le Genre Humain trilogy)

References

External links 
 
 

French comedy-drama films
2004 films
Films directed by Claude Lelouch
2000s French films